Fullblast is the third solo album by Brazilian heavy metal guitarist Kiko Loureiro. Like the others, it is totally instrumental.

Track listing

Personnel
Kiko Loureiro – guitar, keyboards, additional percussion and programming
Felipe Andreoli - bass guitar
Mike Terrana – drums
DaLua - percussion
Yaniel Matos - Rhodes piano on "Whispering"

References

Kiko Loureiro albums
2009 albums